JWH-148 is a synthetic cannabimimetic that was discovered by John W. Huffman. It is the indole 2-methyl analog of JWH-120. It is a moderately selective ligand for the CB2 receptor, with a binding affinity of Ki = 14.0 ± 1.0 nM at this subtype, and more than eight times selectivity over the CB1 subtype.

In the United States, all CB1 receptor agonists of the 3-(1-naphthoyl)indole class such as JWH-148 are Schedule I Controlled Substances.

See also 

 JWH-120
 JWH-122
 JWH-193
 JWH-210
 JWH-398

References 

JWH cannabinoids
Naphthoylindoles
CB1 receptor agonists
CB2 receptor agonists